Tuckwiller Tavern, also known as Valley View Stock Farm, Inc. and Wilson Farm, is a historic tavern located at Lewisburg, Greenbrier County, West Virginia. It was built between 1826 and 1828, and is a large, two-story (plus basement) rectangular brick building with a one-story ell in an early rusticated Greek Revival style.  It sits on a fieldstone foundation and features a portico supported by four massive, white wooden columns. Also on the property is a brick smokehouse.  During the American Civil War, it was used as a headquarters and barracks in 1864 by Union General David Hunter.

It is believed to have been built by "local brickmasons, contractors, and 'architects'" John W. Dunn and David K. Spotts.

It was listed on the National Register of Historic Places in 1975.

References

American Civil War sites in West Virginia
Buildings and structures in Greenbrier County, West Virginia
Drinking establishments on the National Register of Historic Places in West Virginia
Greenbrier County, West Virginia in the American Civil War
Greek Revival houses in West Virginia
Houses completed in 1828
National Register of Historic Places in Greenbrier County, West Virginia
John W. Dunn buildings